The Gender Inequality Index (GII) is an index for measurement of gender disparity that was introduced in the 2010 Human Development Report 20th anniversary edition by the United Nations Development Programme (UNDP). According to the UNDP, this index is a composite measure to quantify the loss of achievement within a country due to gender inequality. It uses three dimensions to measure opportunity cost: reproductive health, empowerment, and labor market participation.
The new index was introduced as an experimental measure to remedy the shortcomings of the previous indicators, the Gender Development Index (GDI) and the Gender Empowerment Measure (GEM), both of which were introduced in the 1995 Human Development Report.

Origins
As international recognition of the importance of eliminating gender inequality was growing, the Gender Development Index (GDI) and the Gender Empowerment Measure (GEM) were introduced in the 1995 Human Development Report. The GDI and GEM became the primary indices for measuring global gender inequality for the United Nations Human Development Reports. The GDI and GEM faced much criticism for their methodological and conceptual limitations.

Beneria and Permanyer have explained that the GDI and GEM are not measurements of gender inequality in and of themselves. The GDI is a composite index which measures development within a country then negatively corrects for gender inequality; and the GEM measures the access women have to attaining means of power in economics, politics, and making decisions. Both of which Beneria and Permanyer claim are inaccurate in clearly capturing gender inequality. According to the UNDP, the GDI was criticized for its inability to accurately measure gender inequality for its components being too closely related to the Human Development Index (HDI), a composite measure of human development used by the UNDP.

Thus, the differences between the HDI and GDI were small leading to the implication that gender disparities were irrelevant to human development. The UNDP also claims that both the GDI and GEM were criticized because income levels had a tendency to dominate the earned income component, which resulted in countries with low income levels not being able to get high scores, even in cases where their levels of gender inequality may have been low. The GEM indicators proved to be more relevant to developed countries than less-developed countries. With international growing concern for gender equality, the participants of the World Economic Forum in 2007, among others, recognized that the advancement of women was a significant issue that impacted the growth of nations.

As of 2006, the World Economic Forum has been using the Gender Gap Index (GGI) in its Global Gender Gap Reports, which ranks countries according to their gender gaps, in an attempt to better capture gender disparities. Beneria and Permanyer criticize the GGI for only capturing inequality in certain aspects of women's lives therefore making it an incomplete measure of gender inequality.

Given the amount of criticism the GDI and GEM were facing, the UNDP felt that these indices did not fully capture the disparities women faced. In an attempt to reform the GDI and GEM, the UNDP introduced the Gender Inequality Index (GII) in the 2010 Human Development Report. The new index is a composite measure which, according to the UNDP, captures the loss of achievement due to gender inequality using three dimensions: reproductive health, empowerment, and labor market participation. The GII does not include income levels as a component, which was one of the most controversial components of the GDI and GEM. It also does not allow for high achievements in one dimension to compensate for low achievement in another.

Dimensions
There are three critical dimensions to the GII: reproductive health, empowerment, and labor market participation. The dimensions are captured in one synthetic index, as to account for joint significance. According to the UNDP, none of the measures in the dimensions pertain to the country's development and therefore a less-developed country can perform well if gender inequality is low. The UNDP considers the dimensions complementary in that inequality in one dimension tends to affect inequality in another. Therefore, the GII captures association across dimensions, making the index association-sensitive, and ensuring that high achievement in one dimension does not compensate for low achievement in another dimension.

Reproductive health
Permanyer notes that the GII is a pioneering index, in that it is the first index to include reproductive health indicators as a measurement for gender inequality. The GII's dimension of reproductive health have two indicators: the Maternal Mortality Ratio (MMR), the data for which come  UNICEF's State of the World's Children, and the adolescent fertility rate (AFR), the data for which is obtained through the UN Department of Economic and Social Affairs, respectively. With a low MMR, it is implied that pregnant women have access to adequate health needs, therefore the MMR is a good measure of women's access to health care. The UNDP expresses that women's health during pregnancy and childbearing is a clear sign of women's status in society.

A high AFR, which measures early childbearing, results in health risks for mothers and infants as well as a lack of higher education attainment. According to the UNDP data, reproductive health accounts for the largest loss due to gender inequality, among all regions.

Empowerment
The empowerment dimension is measured by two indicators: the share of parliamentary seats held by each sex, which is obtained from the International Parliamentary Union, and higher education attainment levels, which is obtained through United Nations Educational, Scientific and Cultural Organization (UNESCO) and Barro-Lee data sets. The GII index of higher education evaluates women's attainment to secondary education and above. Access to higher education expands women's freedom by increasing their ability to question and increases their access to information which expands their public involvement.

There is much literature that finds women's access to education may reduce the AFR and child mortality rates within a country. Due to data limitations the parliament representation indicator is limited to national parliament and excludes local government or other community involvement. Although women's representation in parliament has been increasing women have been disadvantaged in representation of parliament with a global average of only 16%.

Labor market participation
The labor market dimension is measured by women's participation in the workforce. This dimension accounts for paid work, unpaid work, and actively looking for work. The data for this dimension is obtained through the International Labour Organization databases. Due to data limitations women's income and unpaid work are not represented in the labor market dimension of GII. In the absence of reliable earned income data across countries, the UNDP considers labor market participation a suitable substitute for economic aspects of gender inequality.

Calculations
The metrics of the GII are similar in calculations to the Inequality-adjusted Human Development Index (IHDI), which was also introduced in the 2010 Human Development Report, and can be interpreted as a percentage loss of human development due to shortcomings in the included dimensions. The value of GII range between 0 and 1, with 0 being 0% inequality, indicating women fare equally in comparison to men and 1 being 100% inequality, indicating women fare poorly in comparison to men. There is a correlation between GII ranks and human development distribution, according to the UNDP countries that exhibit high gender inequality also show inequality in distribution of development, and vice versa.

The GII is an association-sensitive, responsive to distributional changes across dimension, composite index used to rank the loss of development through gender inequality within a country. The GII measures inequalities by addressing the shortcomings of other measures through aggregate strategy using multiple correspondence analysis (MCA) in order to avoid aggregation problems. There are five steps to computing the gender inequality Index.

Step 1: Treating zeros and extreme values:
The maternal mortality rate is truncated systematically at minimum of 10 and maximum of 1,000. The maximum and minimum is based on the normative assumption that all countries with maternal mortality ratios above 1,000 do not differ in their ability to support for maternal health as well as the assumption that all countries below 10 do not differ in their abilities. 
Countries with parliamentary representation reporting at 0 are counted as 0.1 because of the assumption that women have some level of political influence and that the geometric mean can not have a 0 value.

Step 2: Aggregating across dimensions within each gender group, using geometric means:
Aggregating across dimensions for each gender group by the geometric mean makes the GII association-sensitive. The maternal mortality rate and the adolescent fertility rate are only relevant for females the males are only aggregated with the other two dimensions.

Step 3: Aggregating across gender groups, using a harmonic mean:
To compute the equally distributed gender index the female and male indices are aggregated by the harmonic mean of the geometric means to capture the inequality between females and males and adjust for association between dimensions.

Step 4: Calculating the geometric mean of the arithmetic means for each indicator:
Obtain the reference standard by aggregating female and male indices with equal weight, and then aggregating indices across dimensions.

Reproductive health is not an average of female and male indices but half the distance from the norms established

Step 5: Calculating the Gender Inequality Index:
To compute the GII compare the equally distributed gender index from Step 3 to the reference standard from Step 4.

Changes in 2011 calculations
According to the UNDP there was a minor calculation change to the 2011 Gender Inequality Index from the 2010 index used. The maternal mortality ratio was calculated in the Gender Inequality Index at 10 even though the range of GII values should be between 0 and 1. To correct this the maternal mortality ratio is normalized by 10, which generally reduced the values of the GII.

Rankings
As there is no country with perfect gender equality, all countries suffer some loss of human development due to gender inequality. The difference in dimensions used in the GII and HDI means that the GII is not interpreted as a loss of HDI, but has its own rank and value separate from the HDI. The GII is interpreted as a percentage and indicates the percentage of potential human development lost due to gender inequality. The world average GII score in 2011 was 0.492, which indicates a 49.2% loss in potential human development due to gender inequality. Due to the limitations of data and data quality, the 2010 Human Development Report calculated GII rankings of 138 countries for the year 2008. The 2011 Human Development Report was able to calculate the GII rankings of 146 countries for the reporting year 2011.

The 2019 rankings for all scored countries based on UNDP GII data are:

Top ten countries
The ten highest-ranked countries in terms of gender equality according to the GII for 2008, 2011, and 2012. 

2018 rank and value, source: http://hdr.undp.org/en/content/table-5-gender-inequality-index-gii.

2018: 9th is Iceland, 10th is Republic of Korea. 

Ranking of other countries worth noting: Canada is no. 18, Australia is no. 25, China is no. 39 and United States is no. 42.

Countries not included台灣性別平等 2012排名全球第2, Liberty Times, 2014-09-23

Bottom ten countries
The ten lowest ranked countries in terms of gender equality according to the GII for 2008, 2011, and 2012. 

2018 rank and value, source: http://hdr.undp.org/en/content/table-5-gender-inequality-index-gii.

Criticisms
Although the GII is a relatively new index that has only been in use since 2010, there are some criticisms of the GII as a global measurement of gender inequality. The GII may inadequately capture gender inequality and leave out important aspects or include unnecessary dimensions. The GII is a complex indicator with many components that are difficult for some to interpret or calculate.

Complexity
Klasen and Schüler as well as Permanyer argue that the complexity of the GII will make it difficult to interpret or understand for the professionals who would likely want to make use of it because so many non-linear procedures are applied to the data. Permanyer believes that simplicity is required in order for analysts, policy-makers, or practitioners to convey a clear message to the general public.

Klasen and Schüler claim that the GII is meant to represent a loss of human development, but the standard against which the losses are measured is not stated anywhere, unlike the GDI where the losses were measured against the HDI, making the HDI represent perfect equality. The UNDP explains that the complexity of the calculations are needed in order to maintain an association-sensitive measure, but Permanyer argues that alternative indices that are much less complex have also shown to be association sensitive.

Mix of indices
Both Klasen and Schüler as well as Permanyer argue that the GII mixes indices in a few ways which furthers the complexity and poses other issues. The measurement combines well-being and empowerment which becomes problematic in that it increases the complexity, lacks transparency, and suffers from the problem of using an arithmetic means of ratios. Permanyer argues that it also combines two different, absolute and relative, indicators within the same formula. For example, if the MMR is higher than 10 per 100,000 it is considered inequality. Yet, parliamentary representation is only considered inequality if there is a deviation from 50 percent. Therefore, if women and men fare equally in all dimensions the GII would not equal a zero value as it should. 
Permanyer gives an example for this problem:
Consider a hypothetical country with PRf = PRm, SEf = SEm, LFPRf = LFPRm and with the lowest MMR and AFR observed in the sample of countries for which data is available (MMR = 10, AFR = 3.8). In that case, that hypothetical country would have a GII value well above 0 (GII approximately 0.15).

Regional relevance
Permanyer also criticizes the GII for whether or not its assessment of gender inequality, and uses of the same set of indicators, are equally relevant or meaningful across all regions of the Globe. For less-developed countries the use of the MMR and AFR in the dimension of reproductive health may be penalizing although the loss may not be entirely explained by gender inequality. Less-developed countries performance in the reproductive health dimension may differ regionally or locally. Access to or use of health services can be influenced by socio-economic levels, public health policies, or social and cultural practices. In developed countries, specifically European countries, gender inequality levels are not very "robust to alternative specifications of gender-related indicators" and analysts and policy makers may choose specific methods to yield desired results.

Choice of variables
Klasen and Schüler briefly criticize the GII for its failure to capture the informal work and unpaid domestic or care work where women are primarily over-represented. In many underdeveloped societies women and girls spend the majority of their time in domestic work whereas men and boys spend far less, if any. Therefore, the if the GII lacks the capturing of the time women spend in unpaid labor, it is insufficient in capturing the true global disparities of women.

See also
Gender Development Index
Gender Empowerment Measure
Global Gender Gap Report
Gender Inequalities in Liberia
Human Development Index
Human Development Report
Multiple Correspondence Analysis
United Nations Development Programme
Women in Africa
Women in Islam

References

International rankings
Gender equality